Javier "Javi" Grillo-Marxuach, born October 28, 1969 in San Juan, Puerto Rico, is a television screenwriter and producer, and podcaster, known for his work as writer and producer on the first two seasons of the ABC television series Lost, as well as other series including Charmed and Law & Order: Special Victims Unit.

Early life
Grillo-Marxuach graduated from Huron High school in Ann Arbor, Michigan.  He received a BA in 1991 from Carnegie Mellon. While at CMU he was active as an actor, writer and director with Scotch'n'Soda, the theatrical club for non-theater majors that also counts composer Stephen Schwartz, author Iris Rainer Dart and actor Frank Gorshin among its notable alumni. Grillo-Marxuach also wrote a weekly pop-culture column for the campus newspaper, The Tartan.

He has an MFA from USC and (as of 2015) sponsors a fellowship there for MFA students who demonstrate an interest or facility with Hispanic language and culture.

Career
Grillo-Marxuach joined the crew of Lost as a supervising producer and writer for the first season in 2004. He returned as a supervising producer and writer for the second season in 2005. The writing staff won the Writers Guild of America (WGA) Award for Best Dramatic Series at the February 2006 ceremony for their work on the first and second seasons.  The writing staff were nominated for the WGA Award for Best Dramatic Series again at the February 2007 ceremony for their work on the second and third seasons.

In 2006, he left the Lost team, and began working as a co-executive producer for Medium, as well as entering the world of comics with his own Viper Comics title, The Middleman.  He also wrote the 2006 Annihilation - Super-Skrull limited series for Marvel Comics, part of the company's Annihilation event, and the Annihilation: Conquest - Wraith limited series for the 2007 Annihilation: Conquest follow-up project. He is also writer of Dynamite Entertainment's four-issue limited series Classic Battlestar Galactica: Cylon Apocalypse.

In 2008, the ABC Family picked up his television series The Middleman, for which he is the writer and producer. The series was not picked up for a second season due to poor ratings.

In 2010, a pilot for Department Zero was moved to active production by ABC. The pilot is based upon work by Jonathan Maberry.

In 2014 & 2015, Grillo-Marxuach served as co-executive producer of the SyFy channel's series Helix.

Grillo-Marxuach has also served as a writer and co-executive producer of The 100.

In 2019, he served as one of the writers for The Dark Crystal: Age of Resistance.

Episodes written 
 The Dark Crystal: Age of Resistance (2019) TV Series
 "Time to Make ... My Move" (Season 1, Episode 7)
 "Helix" (2013-2015) TV Series
 "Department Zero" (2010) TV Pilot
 The Middleman (2008) TV Series
 "The Pilot Episode Sanction" (Season 1, Episode 1)
 "The Sino-Mexican Revelation" (Season 1, Episode 3)
 Medium (2005) TV Series
 "Four Dreams Part 1" (Season 3, Episode 1) with Glenn Gordon Caron
 "Four Dreams Part 2" (Season 3, Episode 2) with Glenn Gordon Caron
 "Apocalypse, Push" (Season 3, Episode 11)
 "We Had A Dream" (Season 3, Episode 15)
 "1-900-LUCKY" (Season 3, Episode 18) with Robert Doherty
 "Head Games" (Season 3, Episode 20) with Robert Doherty & Moira Kirkland
 "Burn Baby Burn Part 1" (Season 4, Episode 7)
 "Burn Baby Burn Part 2" (Season 4, Episode 8) with René Echevarria
 Lost (2004) TV Series
 "House of the Rising Sun" (Season 1, Episode 6)
 "All the Best Cowboys Have Daddy Issues" (Season 1, Episode 11)
 "Hearts and Minds" (Season 1, Episode 13) with Carlton Cuse
 "...In Translation" (Season 1, Episode 17) with Leonard Dick
 "Born to Run" (Season 1, Episode 22) (story)
 "Orientation" (Season 2, Episode 3) with Craig Wright
 "Collision" (Season 2, Episode 8) with Leonard Dick
 Jake 2.0 (2003) TV Series
episode "The Good, The Bad and The Geeky"
episode "Whiskey - Tango - Foxtrot"
episode "Get Foley"
 Boomtown (2002) TV Series (writer)
 Episode "Monsters Brawl"
 The Dead Zone (2002) TV Series (story) (episode 1.07 "Enemy Mind")
 The Chronicle (2001) TV Series
episode "Bring Me the Head of Tucker Burns"
episode "Hot From the Oven"
episode "The King is (Un) Dead"
episode "Let Sleeping Dogs Fry"
episode "Pig Boy's Big Adventure"
episode "Touched by An Alien")
 Cops On the Edge: Episode 89 (2000)
 Law & Order: Special Victims Unit (1999) TV Series
episode 3.07 "Sacrifice"
 Charmed (1998) TV Series
episode 1.04 "Dead Man Dating"
episode 1.11 "Feats of Clay"
episode 1.16 "Which Prue is it, Anyway?"
episode 1.21 "Love Hurts"
episode 2.05 "She's a Man, Baby, A Man!"
episode 2.11 "Reckless Abandon"
episode 2.17 "How to Make a Quilt Out of Americans"
Three (1998) TV Series
episode "Breakout"
episode "Emerald City"
Van Helsing Chronicles (1997) (TV)
Dark Skies (1996) TV Series (teleplay)
episode "Hostile Convergence"
The Pretender (1996) TV Series
episode "The Better Part of Valor"
episode "The Paper Clock"
episode "Potato Head Blues"
SeaQuest DSV (1993) TV Series
episode 3.4 "Destination Terminal"
episode 3.7 "Equilibrium"
episode 3.13 "Weapons of War"

Filmography

Bibliography
 Annihilation: Super-Skrull (with artist Greg Titus, 4-issue mini-series, Marvel Comics, 2006)
 Annihilation: Conquest - Wraith (with artist Kyle Hotz, 4-issue mini-series, 2007)
 Battlestar Galactica: Cylon Apocalypse (limited series, Dynamite Entertainment, 2007)
 The Middleman (a number of mini-series, Viper Comics, 2005–present)

See also
List of Puerto Ricans

Footnotes

External links
 
 The Grillo-Marxuach Experimental Design Bureau, personal website of Javier-Grillo Marxuach
 JAVIminions, Official fansite for Javier-Grillo Marxuach
 PopGurls Interview: Javier Grillo-Marxuach
  Zap2it TV News

1969 births
American television producers
American comics writers
Living people
Puerto Rican writers
People from San Juan, Puerto Rico
Primetime Emmy Award winners
Writers Guild of America Award winners
Carnegie Mellon University College of Fine Arts alumni
Puerto Rican people of Catalan descent
USC School of Cinematic Arts alumni